Gordon Dale (20 May 1928 — 14 March 1996) was an English footballer who played as a left winger.

Career
Upon leaving school, Dale signed for hometown club Worksop Town. In February 1948, Chesterfield signed Dale for £500. On 12 March 1949, after spending time in Chesterfield's reserves, Dale made his debut for the club in a 2–1 defeat against Fulham.

On 27 June 1951, following Chesterfield's relegation from the 1950–51 Second Division, First Division side Portsmouth signed Dale for £20,000, becoming Portsmouth's record transfer fee at the time, as well as Chesterfield's record outgoing transfer. Dale only made eight appearances during his first season with Portsmouth, due to injuries. In the 1954–55 season, Dale appeared in more than half of Portsmouth's fixtures for the first time in his career with the club.

On 25 October 1957, Dale signed for Exeter City for a fee of £5,000. A day after signing, Dale made his debut for Exeter in a 2–1 loss away to Bournemouth & Boscombe Athletic. Dale's time at Exeter was a "success", scoring 8 goals in 124 league appearances for the club. In July 1961, Dale signed for Southern League club Chelmsford City.

References

1928 births
1996 deaths
Association football wingers
English footballers
Footballers from Worksop
Worksop Town F.C. players
Chesterfield F.C. players
Portsmouth F.C. players
Exeter City F.C. players
Chelmsford City F.C. players
English Football League players
Southern Football League players